Lord Roberts was a provincial electoral division in the Canadian province of Manitoba, located in the south-central section of the City of Winnipeg. It was created by redistribution in 1999, and consists primarily of territory taken from the now-defunct ridings of Osborne and Crescentwood. The district is named after Field Marshal Lord Roberts.

Lord Roberts was bordered to the south by Fort Garry and St. Vital, to the west by River Heights, to the north by Fort Rouge and St. Boniface and to the east by St. Vital.

Lord Roberts' population in 1996 was 20,469. The average family income in 1999 was $44,963, with an unemployment rate of 7.70%. Thirty-one per cent of the riding's residents are listed as low income. Over 47% of the riding's dwelling houses in 1999 were rental units, and over 20% of the riding's families were single-parent.

Over 19% of the riding's population was above 65 years of age. 14% per cent of the riding's residents were immigrants, including 5% German and 4% Ukrainian. Four percent of the riding's residents were Jewish.

The service sector accounts for 19% of Lord Roberts's industry, followed by 13% in health and social services.

The riding was only ever held by the New Democratic Party of Manitoba (NDP), and was generally considered safe for the party. Its only MLA was Diane McGifford, who was re-elected in 2003 with over 60% of the riding's popular vote.

For the 2011 election, the riding was dissolved into Fort Rouge, River Heights, and the new riding of Fort Garry-Riverview

List of provincial representatives

Electoral results

References

Former provincial electoral districts of Manitoba
Politics of Winnipeg
Lord Roberts (electoral district)